Erin Goad (born 25 May 1993) is a field hockey player from New Zealand, who plays as a defender.

Personal life
Goad was born and raised in Henderson, New Zealand.

Career

National teams

Under–21
Goad debuted for the New Zealand U–21 team in 2013 at the FIH Junior World Cup in Mönchengladbach.

Black Sticks
In 2014, Goad made her debut for the Black Sticks during a test series against the United States in New Zealand.

Following a two-year hiatus from the national team, Goad returned to the squad in 2016 on a more permanent basis. Her most prominent year with the team was 2017, where she appeared in the Hawke's Bay Cup and the FIH World League Final, where she won a silver medal.

International goals

References

External links
 
 

1993 births
Living people
Female field hockey defenders
New Zealand female field hockey players
20th-century New Zealand women
21st-century New Zealand women